Miller–Seabaugh House and Dr. Seabaugh Office Building is a historic home and office building located at Millersville, Cape Girardeau County, Missouri.  The house was built about 1883, and is a -story, irregular plan brick dwelling.  It features arched windows and corbelling along the eaves.  The doctor's office was moved to the property about 1911, and is a one-room frame building on a sandstone foundation.

It was listed on the National Register of Historic Places in 1996.

References

Houses on the National Register of Historic Places in Missouri
Houses completed in 1883
Commercial buildings on the National Register of Historic Places in Missouri
Commercial buildings completed in 1911
Houses in Cape Girardeau County, Missouri
National Register of Historic Places in Cape Girardeau County, Missouri